Fading West (EP) is an extended play by Switchfoot, released on September 17, 2013 through Atlantic Records/Word. Produced by the band and Neal Avron, it contains three songs from Switchfoot's ninth studio album Fading West. A special physical edition of the EP featured a bonus track titled "Fading West".

Release
Fading West EP was released on September 17, 2013 through Atlantic Records/Word. It contained three songs from the band's ninth studio album Fading West, which was released on January 14, 2014. A special physical edition of the EP, only available on Switchfoot's 2013 fall tour and on the band's official website, featured a bonus track "Fading West", which wasn't included on the full album.

The EP was part of a "complete my album" program, meaning that people who bought it would be able to download the remaining tracks from the Fading West album for free, upon the album's release in January 2014.

Critical reception

Ian Zandi of Indie Vision Music rated the EP a perfect five stars and wrote, "Fading West is not the end of Switchfoot. Instead, it is the opening of the next chapter in their globetrotting journey to pursue love and justice. The Fading West EP may not be the best Switchfoot songs ever written. Do they necessarily have to be? Maybe the best is yet to come on the full-length album. This EP is merely just a sample of what we can expect to hear in the movie and on the soundtrack. We were given a theme song, a classic Switchfoot song, and the next possible step in their musical endeavors."

Track listing

Personnel

Switchfoot
Jon Foreman – guitar, lead vocals
Tim Foreman – bass, backing vocals
Chad Butler – drums, percussion
Jerome Fontamillas – keyboard, guitar, backing vocals
Andrew Shirley – guitar, backing vocals

Technical personnel
 Neal Avron – production
 Tanner Sparks - engineering

See also
 Fading West
 Fading West (film)

References

2013 EPs
Albums produced by Neal Avron
Albums produced by Switchfoot
Atlantic Records EPs
Lowercase People Records EPs
Switchfoot EPs